Frederick IV may refer to:

Frederick IV, Duke of Swabia (1145–1167)
Frederick IV, Count of Zollern (c. 1188–c. 1255), Burgrave Friedrich II of Nuremberg
Frederick IV, Duke of Lorraine (1282–1329)
Frederick IV, Burgrave of Nuremberg (1287–1332)
Frederick IV of Sicily (1341–1377), called "Frederick the Simple"
Frederick IV, Duke of Austria (1382–1439) 
Frederick IV, Landgrave of Thuringia (died 1440)
Frederick IV of Naples (1452–1504)
Frederick IV of Brandenburg (1530–1552)
Frederick IV, Elector Palatine (1574–1610), called "Frederick the Righteous"
Frederick IV, Duke of Brunswick-Lüneburg (1574–1648)
Frederick IV, Duke of Holstein-Gottorp (1671–1702)
Frederick IV of Denmark (1671–1730)
Frederick IV, Landgrave of Hesse-Homburg (1724–1751)
Frederick IV, Duke of Saxe-Gotha-Altenburg (1774–1825)
Frederick IV, Prince of Salm-Kyrburg (1789–1859), prince of Salm-Kyrburg, Ahaus and Bocholt

See also 
Friedrich IV, Landgrave of Thuringia (fl. 1406–1440)
Frederick Francis IV, Grand Duke of Mecklenburg-Schwerin (1882–1945)
Frederick William IV of Prussia (1795–1861)